Renato Estanislao Punyed Dubón (born 22 August 1995) is a footballer who plays as a midfielder for Icelandic third-tier club Ægir. He had also a spell with Norwegian club Nybergsund IL-Trysil Born in El Salvador, he represents the Nicaragua national team.

Early life
Punyed was born in San Salvador to a Salvadoran father of Spanish descent and a Nicaraguan mother. The family settled in Doral, Florida, United States.

International career
Punyed made his debut for Nicaragua national team on 3 March 2019 in a friendly against Bolivia.

Personal life
Punyed's older brother Pablo Punyed has played for El Salvador national team.

References

External links
 
 

1995 births
Living people
Sportspeople from San Salvador
People with acquired Nicaraguan citizenship
Nicaraguan men's footballers
Nicaragua international footballers
Salvadoran men's footballers
American men's soccer players
Nicaraguan people of Salvadoran descent
Nicaraguan people of Spanish descent
Salvadoran people of Nicaraguan descent
Salvadoran people of Spanish descent
Salvadoran emigrants to the United States
American people of Nicaraguan descent
American sportspeople of Salvadoran descent
American people of Spanish descent
Association football forwards
High Point Panthers men's soccer players
Úrvalsdeild karla (football) players
Íþróttabandalag Vestmannaeyja players
1. deild karla players
ÍR men's football players
Knattspyrnufélagið Ægir players
Nicaraguan expatriate footballers
Nicaraguan expatriate sportspeople in Iceland
Expatriate footballers in Iceland
Nicaraguan expatriate sportspeople in Norway
Expatriate footballers in Norway
Salvadoran expatriate footballers
Salvadoran expatriate sportspeople in Iceland
Salvadoran expatriate sportspeople in Norway
People with acquired American citizenship
American expatriate soccer players
American expatriate sportspeople in Iceland
American expatriate sportspeople in Norway
Citizens of Spain through descent
2019 CONCACAF Gold Cup players